The Great Commandment is a Christian film by Irving Pichel.

The Great Commandment may also refer to:
Great Commandment, the commandment in Christianity
New Commandment, the new commandment of Jesus
"The Great Commandment" (song), a song by Camouflage